The 2000 DFS Classic was a women's tennis tournament played on grass courts at the Edgbaston Priory Club in Birmingham, United Kingdom that was part of Tier III of the 2000 WTA Tour. It was the 19th edition of the tournament and was held from 12 June until 19 June 2000. Sixth-seeded Lisa Raymond won the singles title and earned $27,000 first-prize money.

Finals

Singles

 Lisa Raymond defeated  Tamarine Tanasugarn 6–2, 6–7(7–9), 6–4
 It was Raymond's first title of the year and the 2nd of her career.

Doubles

 Rachel McQuillan /  Lisa McShea defeated  Cara Black /  Irina Selyutina 6–3, 7–6(7–5)
 It was McQuillan's first doubles title of the year and the 5th of her career. It was McShea's first doubles title of the year and her career.

External links
 ITF tournament edition details 
 Tournament draws

DFS Classic
Birmingham Classic (tennis)
DFS Classic
DFS Classic
2000 in English tennis